E-League is an esports league and Australian television show. It was announced in January 2018 as a partnership with Fox Sports and Twitch.

Competition rules
Each club is represented by two competitors in the E-League (one in each division). The E-League Premiership Rounds is a nine-round period. Each team will play each other club once in a two-legged tie format with two games being played in each division.

A win gives the winning team 3 points, a draw gives both teams 1 point and a loss for the losing team gets 0 points. When there is no result, both teams get 0 points as well. FFA also reserves the right to regulate the result of any match played including a "no result".

The goals from each division will be aggregated to determine the winner for each Club each round within both Xbox One and PlayStation 4 games.

If a player/competitor forfeits a game, the result will be a 3–0 loss for that player, unless that forfeit will take place during the match and the current goal difference is greater than being 3 goals up. The goal difference will result as a 3–0 final score.

Current competitors

Winners

References

External links
 

2018 establishments in Australia
Sports leagues established in 2018
A-League Men
Esports leagues
FIFA (video game series) competitions
Fox Sports (Australian TV network) original programming
Esports television